Patrick Gerald Kennedy (30 July 1898 – 20 September 1981) was an Australian rules footballer who played with St Kilda in the Victorian Football League (VFL).

He later became a boundary umpire from 1925 until 1931.

References

External links 

1898 births
1981 deaths
Australian rules footballers from Melbourne
St Kilda Football Club players
Williamstown Football Club players
Australian Football League umpires
People from Heidelberg, Victoria